Kornecki, Kornicki, Kornetzky, or Kornitzky is the surname of:

Franciszek Kornicki (1916–2017), Polish fighter pilot
Jean-François Kornetzky (born 1982), French football player
Mateusz Kornecki (born 1994), Polish handballer
Nike Kornecki (born 1982), Israeli sailor
Peter Kornicki (born 1950), English Japanologist